Ponta do Sol is a municipality in the southwestern coast of the island of Madeira, in the archipelago of Madeira.

History
The settlement of Ponta do Sol began shortly after the discovery of the island of Madeira, around 1420.

Geography

Ponta do Sol is located between Ribeira-Brava and Calheta, on the southwest coast of Madeira, linked to Funchal (the capital) and surrounding communities by the main regional road.

The municipality is crossed by a few pedestrian hiking trails, that usually follow the levadas carrying water from the mountains.

Human geography
Administratively, the municipal government is located in the civil parish (freguesia) of Ponta do Sol, while local government is handled through the three civil parishes:
 Canhas
 Madalena do Mar
 Ponta do Sol - in 2011, the parish had a population of 4,577 inhabitants, in an area of

Economy
Historically, the main sources of income in this region has been agriculture, fishing and trade. Ponta do Sol's main harbour, although small, was a crucial commercial gateway to the western part of the island. These importation and exportation businesses fostered the creation of new activities in what became the central part of the community and created a flow of goods into the hinterland (such as local and imported goods).

Today, commercial activity is scattered throughout the municipality, while the port area of Ponta do Sol has declined in importance. In its place, the economy of the municipality has been dispersed to other parishes, particularly Canhas, which were essentially agricultural parishes, but have developed into important economic nodes, while still retaining its rural landscape. While agriculture remains the primary activity in the interior, and the fisheries industry has declined significantly, construction and industrial enterprises have conquered a prominent role in the municipality. The service industry, particularly tourism, has carved-out a portion of the income stream, with high-quality hotels or residential inns located in the countryside and urban centres.

References

External links
 
Photos of Ponta do Sol

Madeira Island
Municipalities of Madeira
Populated places established in the 1420s
Towns in Portugal